Air Chief Marshal Mohammad Anwar Shamim ; (1 October 1931 – 4 January 2013) was a senior air officer of the Pakistan Air Force and was the Chief of Air Staff, appointed to the post in 1978 until retiring in 1985.

Born in Haripur, British India in 1931, he was a career fighter pilot who participated in conflict with India in 1965 and in 1971, before playing a crucial role as a military adviser to Jordan against the Palestinian insurgent groups in 1970.

As an air chief, Shamim is notable for taking initiatives to modernize the air force by successfully acquiring the F-16 Fighting Falcon from the United States under the Project Falcon in 1983, and acquiring the radar technology from the United States to strengthened his country's aerial defense. During his tenureship, he played an influential role in the Zia administration, advising President Zia on policy matters involving the national security.

In addition, Shamim also holds the distinction of being the second longest serving chief of air staff of the Pakistan Air Force. He died in January 2013 and was buried with full state honours.

Biography

Early life and education
Anwar Shamim was born in Haripur, Hazara District, NWFP in India, on 31 October 1931. He hailed from an academic family and his parents were teachers at the local school. He received his early education and matriculated Government College in Campbellpur (Attock) before becoming the member of the University Air Squadron of the Royal Air Force.

In 1950, he joined the RPAF College at Risalpur from where he was selected to attend the Royal Australian Air Force College  at Point Cook where he completed the basic flying training course. Upon returning to Pakistan, he gained commission as Pilot officer in No. 12 Squadron Globe Globe Trotters in 1952. Flying Officer Shamim was sent to the United States to be trained to fly the F-104 Starfighter, and was later directed to attend the Air Command and Staff College in Montgomery, Alabama, in the 1960s where he gained degree in Defence studies.

In the 1970s, he went to attend the National Defence University in Islamabad, and attained his master's degree in national security course.

War and staff appointments in the military

In 1963, Squadron-Leader Shamim took over the command of the No. 11 Squadron Arrows, which he commanded until 1965. While in the United States, he qualified as a test pilot, flying mostly the F-104 and F-86 while performing the combat maneuvering.

In 1965, Wing-Commander Shamim took over the command of the No. 33 (Tactical) Wing as its officer commanding, and participated in the second war with India in 1965. During the aerial operations, Wing Commander Shamim flew his F-104, along with F-86 against the Indian Air Force's MiG-21. His combat wing led several attacking and bombing missions against the Indian Air Force's attempt for an air superiority.

After the war with India, Group Captain Shamim was posted with the Pakistan Armed Forces–Middle East Command, serving first as an air adviser to the Royal Jordanian Air Force in 1967. Group Captain Shamim played a crucial role in advising the importance of air superiority to King Hussain during the war with Israel. In 1970, Gp. Capt. Shamim, acting as a military adviser to the Jordanian military, played a decisive role in gathering the military intelligence on Palestine Liberation Organization (PLO) in support of the Pakistan Armed Forces–Middle East Command led by its Chief of Staff then Brigadier Zia-ul-Haq. His efforts won the praise from King Hussain, honoring him with a national decoration.

In 1971, Gp. Capt. Shamim returned to Pakistan from his assignment, and was appointed as base commander of Masroor Air Force Base, mainly focusing on the aerial defence, though he continued directing combat air operations.

In 1974–76, Air Commodore Shamim was appointed Air Officer Commanding of the Southern Air Command, but was later posted as ACAS (Air Operations) at the Air AHQ on a two-star rank, Air Vice Marshal.

In 1978, AVM Shamim was promoted to Air Marshal.

Chief of Air Staff

On 23 July 1978, when Air Chief Marshal Zulfikar Ali Khan completed an extended tenure of four years, Air Commodore Anwar Shamim was promoted to ACM and appointed Chief of the Air Staff.

President Fazal Ilahi approved to elevate the junior most air officer, Anwar Shamim, to the four-star rank, superseding several seniors for this appointment.

Once appointed air chief, ACM Shamim began taking initiatives to modernize the air force by acquiring fighter jets from the United States and China.

ACM Shamim's tenureship is subjected to two extension as a chief of air staff, first receiving it in 1982 at the behest of the President General Zia to supervise the complete induction of the F-16A/B fighter jets in the air force.  In 1983, ACM Shamim was given another extension as an air chief for two more year. Repeated extension of ACM Shamim as chief of air staff made him the longest serving chief of the air force.

Under his command, the air force was involved in combat sorties with the Soviet Air Forces in Afghanistan in shooting down the Soviet fighter jets violating the airspace of Pakistan only, but he did not authorized the air force's F-16s for a hot pursuit missions in Afghanistan.

F-16 Fighting Falcon program

In 1979, ACM Shamim had notified President General Zia that Kahuta's ERL was an indefensible site because it was at three minutes flying time for the Indian IAF from the border, while the reaction time for the Pakistan Air Force's fighter jets would be about eight minutes, resulting in the enemy completing the job and reporting to their base safely. ACM Shamim explored the idea of defending the nuclear deterrence by suggesting to acquire the American F-16s, allowing the PAF to have a second strike capability to destroying the Indian nuclear facility at Trombay, India. ACM Shamim refused to acquire the F-5E aircraft from the United States, and provided a strong advocacy for acquiring the F-16s. In 1980, ACM Shamim led successful talks with China, and acquired the F-6s to be inducted in the air force to protect the facilities.

The Pakistan MoD and the U.S. DoD entered in negotiations to acquire the F-16s, with Air Chief Marshal Shamim later launching the Project Falcon, appointing Air Vice Marshal H. Durrani as its Project-Director.

On 15 January 1983, the three F-16As in a single squadron flown under the leadership of then-Air Vice Marshal Jamal Khan reached the country. When the F-16As were arrived, ACM Shamim directed a secret memo to confirm that the Indian attack on the nuclear facilities in the country will be met with retaliatory attack by the PAF, using the F-16s as their primary weapons. During this time, he maintained close relations with Lieutenant General Arnold Braswell of the United States Air Force on mutual security issues.

After Israel successfully launched a surprise airstrike on an Iraqi nuclear power plant, the fears in Pakistan increased with intelligence community asserting that India reciprocating the following the similar suit to destroy the nuclear infrastructure in Pakistan. Upon learning the development between Iraq and Israel, ACM Shamim tightened the security of the nuclear facilities by establishing the strategic air command.

In 1980, Air Chief Marshal Shamim also witnessed the commissioning and induction of the A-5 Fantan in the air force, acquiring the first squadron in 1981.

In 1982, ACM Shamim acquired the additional batch of Dassault Mirage 5 that would provide support on aerial defence for the Pakistan Navy.

Air Force Strategic Command

After Israel successfully launched a surprise airstrike on an Iraqi nuclear power plant, the fears in Pakistan increased with intelligence community asserting that India reciprocating the following the similar suit to destroy the nuclear infrastructure in Pakistan. Upon learning the development between Iraq and Israel, ACM Shamim tightened the security of the nuclear facilities by establishing the strategic air command.

The Air Force Strategic Command was primary tasked with protecting and providing the aerial defence of the country's clandestine nuclear deterrence. The Air Force Strategic Command later over taken the satellite operations which were then run under Space Research Commission, providing the financial support for developing the nation's first communication satellite.

Retirement and later life
In 1985, Air Chief Marshal Shamim refused to accept the extension as an air chief despite President General President Zia approving his third extension. ACM Shamim was eventually succeeded by Air Chief Marshal Jamal Khan, and decided to settle in Islamabad, Pakistan.

In 1986, General President Zia appointed him as the High Commissioner of Pakistan to Canada to lead Pakistan's mission but the Canadian government refused take his appointment. In 1987, he was then attempted to be sent as a Pakistan Ambassador to Saudi Arabia but this was also refused by the Saudi Arabia, citing unknown reasons.

During this time, his strong political advocacy and role in developing toward the nuclear weapons was exposed by the investigative journalism in the United States, leading him to return to Pakistan and sell his home in the United States to avoid federal inquires by the United States government. In 1988–89, he joined the Dawn, writing and penning articles on security issues in Afghanistan.

In 1999–2000, Shamim was implicated in several allegations in the corruption inquires conducted by National Accountability Bureau (NAB) but details of his assets were then marked as classified by President Pervez Musharraf.

In 2010, he wrote and published his memoirs, Cutting Edge, recounting his memories during this tenureship as an air chief.

Death and State funeral

On 3 January 2013, Shamim was admitted at the Combined Military Hospital in Rawalpindi and passed away on 4 January 2013 after a prolonged illness. His death was widely reported and, it was announced by the Government of Pakistan to give him the proper burial with state honors.

Shamim was given a state funeral and was attended by Air Chief Marshal Tahir Rafiq, then-air chief, Admiral Asif Sandila, then-navy chief, Gen. Ashfaq Parvez Kayani, then-army chief, former air chiefs, war veterans, diplomatics, and other dignitaries. President Asif Zardari paid tribute to his services for the nation and prayed to Allah, the Almighty, to rest the departed soul in eternal peace and to give courage to the bereaved family to bear this loss with fortitude.

Anwar Shamim is buried in H-11 Graveyard, Islamabad; beautiful granite memorial crowned by Pakistan Air Force emblem marks his last resting place.

Legacy

ACM Anwar Shamim was noted as the second longest serving chief of air staff, commanding the air force for nearly seven years whose tenureship saw the induction of the F-16s in the air force. While there were several allegations of nepotism and improper conduct, But this has been fervently denied by his family

ACM Anwar Shamim started the air force's exercise that were integrated with the other branches of the Pakistani military in the 1980s for the leadership under Chairman joint chiefs to understand and appreciate exactly what the PAF could and could not do.

Awards and decorations

Foreign Decorations

Published works

Memoirs

See also

Pakistan Air Force

References

External links
PAF s' Chief of the Air Staffs
Bio of Air Chief Marshal Anwar Shamim
Air Chief Marshal Anwar Shamim – Ghazi of 1965 War

1931 births
2013 deaths
People from Haripur District
People from Attock District
Pakistan Air Force Academy alumni
Pakistani expatriates in the United States
Air Command and Staff College alumni
Pakistani test pilots
Pilots of the Indo-Pakistani War of 1965
Pakistani air attachés
Pakistani expatriates in Jordan
Recipients of the Order of Independence (Jordan)
Pilots of the Indo-Pakistani War of 1971
Pakistan Air Force air marshals
Chiefs of Air Staff, Pakistan
Foreign recipients of the Legion of Merit
Recipients of Sitara-i-Imtiaz
Recipients of Sitara-e-Jurat
Recipients of Hilal-i-Imtiaz
Recipients of Nishan-e-Imtiaz
Military government of Pakistan (1977–1988)
Pakistani memoirists
People from Islamabad
State funerals in Pakistan